The 2008–09 George Mason Patriots men's basketball team began its 43rd season of collegiate play on November 15, 2008 versus the University of Vermont.  The players were looking to continue the success from their 2007–2008 season where they won the 2008 Colonial Athletic Association tournament championship game and advanced to the 2008 NCAA men's basketball tournament. The 2008–09 Patriots had a    13 – 5 regular season record and were runners-up in the 2009 Colonial Athletic Association tournament.  The team reached the 2009 National Invitation Tournament, but they lost in overtime to eventual tournament champion Penn State.

Season notes
 On February 2, 2009, it was announced that George Mason would play the Creighton Bluejays on February 21 as part of the annual ESPN Bracket Busters event.
 On January 21, 2009, during a game versus Northeastern University, senior guard John Vaughan suffered a concussion and was carted off the court. He was taken to a local hospital and released later that night. He missed at least 1 week of action.
 On December 27, 2008, it was announced that sophomore forward Vlad Moldoveanu will be released from his basketball commitment. He enrolled at American University.
 On December 22, 2008, the George Mason men's basketball team won their 600th game in the history of the program.

Awards

Second Team All-CAA
 Darryl Monroe
 John Vaughan

Third Team All-CAA
 Cam Long

CAA All-Rookie Team
 Ryan Pearson

CAA All-Defensive Team
 John Vaughan

CAA Player of the Week
 Darryl Monroe – Jan. 12

CAA Rookie of the Week
 Ryan Pearson – Nov. 17
 Ryan Pearson – Dec. 1

Roster

Stats

Game log

|-
!colspan=12 style=| Non-conference regular season

|-
!colspan=12 style=|<span style=>CAA regular season

|-
!colspan=12 style=|CAA tournament

|-
!colspan=12 style=|National Invitation tournament

Recruiting
The following is a list of players signed for the 2009–10 season:

References

George Mason
George Mason
George Mason Patriots men's basketball seasons
George Mason
George Mason